The Sphagnaceae is a family of moss with only one living genus Sphagnum.

References

Moss families
Sphagnales